The following lists events that happened during 1975 in New Zealand.

Population
 Estimated population as of 31 December: 3,143,700
 Increase since 31 December 1974: 51,800 (1.68%)
 Males per 100 females: 99.5

Incumbents

Regal and viceregal
Head of State – Elizabeth II
Governor-General – Sir Denis Blundell GCMG GCVO KBE QSO.

Government
The 37th New Zealand Parliament continued. Government was by a
Labour majority of 55 seats to the National Party's 32 seats.  At 29 November election, the allocation of seats for the 38th parliament was reversed and the National Party formed the new government on 12 December.

Speaker of the House – Stan Whitehead.
Prime Minister – Bill Rowling then Robert Muldoon
Deputy Prime Minister – Bob Tizard then Brian Talboys.
Minister of Finance – Bob Tizard then Robert Muldoon.
Minister of Foreign Affairs – Bill Rowling then Brian Talboys.
Attorney-General – Martyn Finlay then Peter Wilkinson.
Chief Justice — Sir Richard Wild

Parliamentary opposition
 Leader of the Opposition –   Robert Muldoon (National) until 12 December, then Bill Rowling (Labour).

Main centre leaders
Mayor of Auckland – Dove-Myer Robinson
Mayor of Hamilton – Mike Minogue
Mayor of Wellington – Michael Fowler
Mayor of Christchurch – Hamish Hay
Mayor of Dunedin – Jim Barnes

Events
 4 February – American Lynne Cox becomes the first woman to swim across Cook Strait, making the north–south crossing in just over 12 hours.
 31 May – Disappearance (and presumed death) of 18-year-old Mona Blades.
 14 September – Māori land march protesting at land loss leaves Te Hapua.
 13 October – Māori land march reaches Parliament building in Wellington, Whina Cooper presents a Memorial of Rights to the Prime Minister Bill Rowling and Māori Affairs Minister Matiu Rata.
 29 November – 1975 general election.
 The Dunedin Longitudinal Study begins, following the health and development of 1037 children born in Dunedin between 1972 and 1973.

Arts and literature
Witi Ihimaera wins the Robert Burns Fellowship.

See 1975 in art, 1975 in literature

Music

New Zealand Music Awards
ALBUM OF THE YEAR  John Hanlon – Higher Trails
BEST SINGLE / SINGLE OF THE YEAR  Rockinghorse – Thru' The Southern Moonlight
RECORDING ARTIST/ GROUP OF THE YEAR  Mark Williams
BEST NEW ARTIST  Space Waltz
PRODUCER OF THE YEAR  Alan Galbraith – Yesterday Was Just The Beginning of My Life
ENGINEER OF THE YEAR  Phil Yule – Higher Trails
ARRANGER OF THE YEAR  Mike Harvey – Higher Trails
COMPOSER OF THE YEAR  John Hanlon – Higher Trails

See: 1975 in music

Performing arts

 Benny Award presented by the Variety Artists Club of New Zealand to Phillip Warren QSO.

Radio and television
On 1 April, the New Zealand Broadcasting Corporation is split into the competing channels Television One and Television Two. Television One begins broadcasting from the new Avalon studio in Lower Hutt.
12 May: Close to Home first airs.
30 June: Television Two (TV2) starts broadcasting on Monday 30 June. Jennie Goodwin is the first female newsreader in the Commonwealth.
5 July: Television Two holds the first Telethon in New Zealand.  
Feltex Television Awards:
Best Documentary: Show on New Guinea's coming independence
First Series Awards: Country Calendar
Best Performer: Joe Cot'e
Best Actor in TV Drama: Ian Mune as Derek
Writing: Michael Noonan in Longest Winter and Michael King in Tangata Whenua

See: 1975 in New Zealand television, 1975 in television, List of TVNZ television programming, :Category:Television in New Zealand, :Category:New Zealand television shows, Public broadcasting in New Zealand

Film
Test Pictures

See: :Category:1975 film awards, 1975 in film, List of New Zealand feature films, Cinema of New Zealand, :Category:1975 films

Sport

Athletics
 Anthony Reavley wins his first national title in the men's marathon, clocking 2:19:54.6 on 1 March in Dunedin.

Chess
 The 82nd National Chess Championship is held in Dunedin, and is won by Paul Garbett of Auckland (his second title).

Horse racing

Harness racing
 New Zealand Trotting Cup: Lunar Chance
 Auckland Trotting Cup: Captain Harcourt

Netball
 The 4th Netball World Championships were held in New Zealand, with Australia winning, England second and New Zealand third.

Soccer
 New Zealand National Soccer League won by Christchurch United
 The Chatham Cup is won by Christchurch United who beat Blockhouse Bay 4—2 (after extra time) in the final.

Births
 1 January: Skippy Hamahona, field hockey player.
 2 January: Reuben Thorne, rugby player.
 4 January: Bevan Hari, field hockey striker .
 5 January: Kylie Bax, model.
 3 February: Brad Thorn, rugby league and union player.
 2 March: Daryl Gibson, rugby player.
 17 January: Tony Brown, rugby player.
 27 March: Andrew Blowers, rugby player.
 21 April: Danyon Loader, swimmer.
 2 May: Murray Burdan, swimmer.
 12 May: Jonah Lomu, rugby player.
 15 May: Danny Hay, soccer player.
 7 June: Shane Bond, cricketer.
 10 July: Scott Styris, cricketer.
 17 July: Andre Adams, cricketer.
 20 July: Greg Feek, rugby player.
 7 August: Jason Suttie, kickboxer.
 11 August: Rua Tipoki, rugby player.
 21 August: Mark Robinson, rugby player.
 21 August: Scott Robertson, rugby player.
 23 August: Sean Marks, basketballer.
 27 August: Caryn Paewai, field hockey player.
 31 August: Craig Cumming, cricketer.
 9 September: Anton Oliver, rugby player.
 12 September: Belinda Colling, netball player.
 2 October: Mark Porter, V8 Supercar driver.
 14 October: Carlos Spencer, rugby player.
 23 October: Temepara George, netball player.
 9 November (in Australia): Mathew Sinclair, cricketer.
 14 December: Lisa Walton, field hockey player
 (in Britain): Toa Fraser, playwright.
 Craig McNair, politician.
 Chong Nee, musician.
 Nikki Jenkins, gymnast
:Category:1975 births

Deaths
 6 February: Air Chief Marshal Sir Keith Park, senior RAF commander
 A.H. Reed, publisher and writer
 Philip Skoglund, politician.

See also
List of years in New Zealand
Timeline of New Zealand history
History of New Zealand
Military history of New Zealand
Timeline of the New Zealand environment
Timeline of New Zealand's links with Antarctica

References

External links

 
New Zealand
Years of the 20th century in New Zealand